War Memorial Auditorium is a 2,110-seat multi-purpose arena and convention center in Fort Lauderdale, Florida, U.S.

The venue hosted professional wrestling cards from the Championship Wrestling from Florida promotion between 1951 and 1987. It was later home to television tapings for Ladies Major League Wrestling in 1990 and UWF Fury Hour in 1991.

It was also host to ECW Hardcore Heaven in 1997, MLW WarGames in 2003, ROH Showdown in the Sun in 2012, and MLW WarGames in 2018.

The venue has hosted professional boxing cards since 1950, including the professional debut of Mickey Rourke in 1991.

The Florida Panthers, who play at FLA Live Arena in nearby Sunrise, Florida, began leasing the venue in 2019 with plans to renovate it for community use.

References

External links

War Memorial Auditorium on BoxRec
War Memorial Auditorium on Internet Wrestling Database
War Memorial Auditorium on WrestlingData.com

Concert halls in Florida
Convention centers in Florida
Music venues in Florida
Sports venues in Florida
1950 establishments in Florida
Event venues established in 1950
Sports venues completed in 1950
Mixed martial arts venues in Florida
Tourist attractions in Fort Lauderdale, Florida